Flaviaesturariibacter luteus is a Gram-negative, rod-shaped, non-spore-forming and non-motile bacterium from the genus of Flaviaesturariibacter which has been isolated from soil from an agricultural floodplain from Mashare in Namibia.

References

External links
Type strain of Flaviaesturariibacter luteus at BacDive -  the Bacterial Diversity Metadatabase

Chitinophagia
Bacteria described in 2017